Lieutenant Colonel J. C. J. Kimaro was the first Kenyan to command the Kenya Navy, replacing Royal Navy officer Commander W. A. E. Hall in 1972. He was killed in a car accident in 1978.

References 

1978 deaths
Year of birth missing
Kenyan military personnel